American rock band Bon Jovi has released 15 studio albums, three live albums, five compilation albums, five EPs, 66 singles, 14 video albums, and 71 music videos. Bon Jovi has sold over 130 million records worldwide, making them one of the best-selling bands of all time. As of 2018, the band has sold 21.8 million albums in the US Nielsen SoundScan era. Billboard ranked Bon Jovi as the 45th Greatest Artist of all time, achieving 6 No. 1 albums on the Billboard 200 & 4 No. 1 hits on the Billboard Hot 100. According to Recording Industry Association of America, Bon Jovi has sold 34.5 million albums in the United States (including 1 diamond album, 5 multi-platinum albums, 11 platinum albums and 14 gold albums).

The group's first commercial release was the single "Runaway" from its eponymous debut (1984), which had a modest success in the US. Its sophomore album 7800° Fahrenheit (1985) achieved bigger success than its predecessor being the band's first album to be certified gold by the Recording Industry Association of America (RIAA) for shipping 500,000 copies in the US.

Bon Jovi achieved widespread global recognition with its third album Slippery When Wet (1986), which remains their best-selling album to date with over 28 million copies sold worldwide. It reached number one in Australia, Canada, and the US, where it spent eight weeks at the top of the Billboard 200 and was certified 12× Platinum by the RIAA. The album's first two singles "You Give Love a Bad Name" and "Livin' on a Prayer" reached number one on the Billboard Hot 100 chart. Bon Jovi's fourth album New Jersey (1988) achieved similar global success, producing five top-10 singles on the Billboard Hot 100, of which "Bad Medicine" and "I'll Be There for You" topped the chart.

Keep the Faith (1992) marked a change in the band's appearance and sound, eschewing the glam metal from its 1980s albums in a favor of a different hard rock sound. The album debuted at number one in the UK and Australia, cracked the top 5 in the US and was certified 2× Platinum by the RIAA for shipping two million copies in the United States. The ballad "Bed of Roses" peaked at number 10 on the Billboard Hot 100 and the album's title track hit number one on the Mainstream Rock Tracks. The greatest hits album Cross Road (1994) debuted at number one and was the best-selling album in United Kingdom for 1994. "Always", the first of the compilation's two new tracks, spent six months in the top 10 of the Billboard Hot 100, was certified platinum in the US and became Bon Jovi's highest selling single.

These Days (1995) was the group's first release after the departure of bassist Alec John Such. The record was a commercial success in the Asian and European markets, debuting at number one in the UK and spending four consecutive weeks at the top. In Japan, the album topped the Oricon chart with first week sales of 379,000 copies, becoming the second fastest selling international album in chart's history. Its lead single "This Ain't a Love Song" reached number 14 in the US and number six in the UK. Crush (2000) became the band's sixth and fifth consecutive number one album in Australia and the United Kingdom, respectively, and reached 2× Platinum in the US. The success of the album was largely due to its lead single "It's My Life" which was nominated for a Grammy Award for Best Rock Performance by a Duo or Group, while the album was nominated for Best Rock Album at the 2001 ceremony.

Bounce (2002) and Have a Nice Day (2005) debuted at number two on the Billboard 200, Bon Jovi's highest debuts in the band's 20-year history up to that point. The lead single "Have a Nice Day" was an international hit, reaching the top 10 in Australia, Europe and the UK. The second single "Who Says You Can't Go Home" reached number one on the Billboard Hot Country Songs after being remixed into a country duet with Jennifer Nettles. With success of the single, Bon Jovi was the first rock band to have reached the top spot on both the rock and country Billboard chart. The song's success inspired the Nashville-influenced tenth studio record Lost Highway (2007). The album debuted at number one in the US, making it the band's first number one in its home country since the late eighties. Although the album achieved great success, including a Grammy nomination for Best Pop Vocal Album, the band returned to its rock roots with the eleventh studio album The Circle (2009), which debuted at number one on the Billboard 200. The lead singles from both albums "(You Want to) Make a Memory" and "We Weren't Born to Follow" received Grammy nominations for Best Pop Performance by a Duo or Group with Vocals.

The second greatest hits album Greatest Hits (2010) was released as a single-disc version and as an enhanced double-disc version which features four new songs. It performed well in Australia, reaching 3× platinum in two months. The album's first single was "What Do You Got?" and its accompanying music video was the first Bon Jovi music video to be filmed in 3D. What About Now (2013) was the band's fifth release to reach the top of the Billboard 200, debuting at number one. Its lead single "Because We Can" was released two months before the album. This was followed by a fan compilation album Burning Bridges (2015), which failed to enter the top 10 on the Billboard 200. This House Is Not for Sale (2016) debuted at number one in the US with sales mostly driven by a concert ticket promotion. The album returned to the top spot two years later thanks to another concert tour, as the album was included in the ticket price.

Albums

Studio albums

Live albums

Compilation albums

Box sets

Extended plays

Singles

1980s

1990s

2000s

2010s

2020s

Other singles

Other charted songs

Notes
 A^ Released as a single only in Japan (except "Bounce", which was released as a promo single in US)
 B^ As it had not been issued as a retail-available single in the US, "Never Say Goodbye" was not eligible to chart on the Billboard Hot 100; however, it peaked at number 28 on the Hot 100 Airplay chart.
 C^ "Please Come Home for Christmas" was originally credited as a solo recording by Jon Bon Jovi when included on the Christmas compilation A Very Special Christmas 2 in 1992, but when released as a single in the UK, Ireland and Europe in 1994 it was released under the band name.
 D^ "Something for the Pain" and "Lie to Me" were released and charted as a double A-side single in the US.
 E^ Released as a single only in Europe.
 F^ The country version of "Who Says You Can't Go Home" with Jennifer Nettles peaked at #1 on the Billboard Hot Country Songs chart.
 G^ Charted from airplay.
 H^ Charted due to digital download sales.

Videos

Live performances

Video collections

Documentaries

Music videos

Notes:
A^ "Real Life" features all band members except David Bryan who was absent due to a serious hand injury.
B^ "Wanted Dead or Alive 2003" was a reused music video from the promo single "Wanted Dead or Alive Live" from 2001. It was slightly reworked to match the reworked music of the song.

See also
 Jon Bon Jovi discography
 Richie Sambora discography
 David Bryan discography
 List of Bon Jovi songs
 List of best-selling music artists
 List of best-selling Western artists in Japan
 List of best-selling albums
 List of best-selling albums in Australia
 List of best-selling albums in the United States
 List of artists who reached number one in the United States

Notes

References

Citations

General

External links
 

Discography
Discographies of American artists
Rock music group discographies